Three Ridges Wilderness is a U.S. Wilderness Area in the Glenwood/Pedlar Ranger District of the George Washington and Jefferson National Forests. The wilderness area is located just east of the Blue Ridge Parkway between the Tye River and Wintergreen Ski Resort.

It is separated from the boundary of the Priest Wilderness by Virginia State Route 56.

Recreation 
The Appalachian Trail crosses through the wilderness for approximately ten miles.  This section of the Appalachian Trail, combined with the other trail in the wilderness, the three mile long Mau-Har Trail, creates "one of the best loop trails in the state of Virginia," according to one guidebook. These trails are maintained by the Tidewater Appalachian Trail Club, a trail maintenance club affiliated with the Appalachian Trail Conservancy.  There are two Appalachian Trail shelters within the wilderness, the Maupin Field Shelter to the north, and the Harper's Creek Shelter, 2.6 trail miles from the Tye River.

See also
List of U.S. Wilderness Areas
Wilderness Act

References

External links
 National Forest Web site
 Wilderness.net
 TopoQuest topographic map
 Three Ridges hike detail

Blue Ridge Mountains
George Washington and Jefferson National Forests
IUCN Category Ib
Protected areas of Nelson County, Virginia
Wilderness areas of Virginia